David Lean was an English film director, producer, screenwriter and editor. 

Widely considered one of the most influential directors of all time, Lean directed the large-scale epics The Bridge on the River Kwai (1957), Lawrence of Arabia (1962), Doctor Zhivago (1965), and A Passage to India (1984). He also directed two adaptations of Charles Dickens novels, Great Expectations (1946) and Oliver Twist (1948), as well as the romantic drama Brief Encounter (1945).

He received various awards including eleven Academy Awards nominations winning twice for Best Director for Bridge on the River Kwai (1957) and Lawrence of Arabia (1962). He also received five Golden Globe Award nominations winning three awards for Best Director for The Bridge on the River Kwai (1957), Lawrence of Arabia (1962), and Doctor Zhivago (1964). He also received fourteen British Academy Film Award nominations winning six awards. In 1974 he won the BAFTA Fellowship for Outstanding British Contribution in Film.

Major associations

Academy Award

British Academy Film Awards

Golden Globe Awards

Miscellaneous awards

References 

Awards
Lean, David